Emil Voigt may refer to:

Emil Voigt (athlete) (1883–1973), British athlete, winner of the Olympic 5 miles race in 1908
Emil Voigt (gymnast) (1875–1961), American gymnast and track and field athlete who competed in the 1904 Summer Olympics